Events from the year 1768 in Canada.

Incumbents
Monarch: George III

Governors
Governor of the Province of Quebec: James Murray
Governor of Nova Scotia: Montague Wilmot
Commodore-Governor of Newfoundland: Hugh Palliser

Events
 Guy Carleton succeeds James Murray as governor off Quebec.

Births
 March – Tecumseh (died 1813)

Deaths

Historical documents
Gov. Carleton is to call popular assembly in Quebec when possible, encourage Protestant schools, grant land only to those capable of farming, etc.

To keep their loyalty, Carleton wants to allow Canadians judicial redress without fees and delays, plus few honorary positions and civil service jobs

Former governor James Murray defends duties he levied as lower than those of French regime, which he proved in court in lawsuit against him

Writer not surprised Quebec is poor, and likely to be poorer, when tradesmen set up as merchants and buy foreign goods they could make themselves

Numerous house fires in Montreal and Quebec, from people not cleaning their chimneys, necessitate ordinance for chimney cleaning every four weeks

April 11 fire in Montreal drives scores of families from their homes, but reportedly none are injured

Valentine, "a Panis Indian," guilty of murdering army officer and servant, to be hanged "and his Body to be delivered to the Surgeons to be dissected"

Surgeon offers inoculation (gratis to poor) "by which Means he has procured sufficient Infection for those who chuse to be inoculated"

Discharged soldiers and others who have lots on Gaspé and Chaleur bays must clear, work or drain 3 acres for every 50 of each lot within 3 years

Teacher will teach reading (by sounds rather than alphabet names of letters), writing, English, Latin, "true" double-entry Italian bookkeeping etc.

Man falsely sworn to be father of woman's child informs readers that real father has demanded child and "challenged her" for claiming it's him

"To Be Sold, a very healthy handy Negro Girl, about Eleven Years of Age, speaks both French and English."

Husband of missing woman describes her, offers $1.50 reward, and wants her to "acknowledge her Fault, and tell me truly, who it was encouraged her"

Notice seeking "Will, the Property of Eleazar Levy, [who] is much known in Canada, [and] speaks French, English and Spanish;" $4 reward offered

William Johnson's conference with Indigenous people in which Six Nations "and all their Tributaries" agree to land cession and boundary

Trade as far as Mississippi "very dull" while French and Spanish from New Orleans undersell British, who hold Sauk hostages after violence along river

Robert Rogers brought to Montreal under strong guard, committed to "the Chateau, and double Centinels set over him"

On Lake Huron, Alexander Henry and others avoid starving by eating rock tripe, thus not needing plan to cannibalize young woman among them

British government pleased "that the Acadians have at length seen that their true interests lie in a due Submission to His [Majesty's] Government"

Certificate of "Pierre Beliveau an accadian" showing he has taken oath of allegiance to King in Kings County, Nova Scotia court

Nova Scotia Lt. Gov. Francklin pleased so many Acadians take oath of allegiance, and has no intention to use them in military or oppose their religion

Francklin praises priest for "quieting the minds of the Indians" and "reconciling the consciencies [sic] of the Accadians who have lately taken the Oaths"

Surveyor Charles Morris: Saint John River is "fine Country of Land in general [and] every necessary Convenience of Life can be had at an easy Rate"

At settlement of disbanded New England soldiers on Saint John River, hemp grown more than 9 ft. tall marks success "beyond their Expectation"

"Grimross is the most considerable Settlement that the French had" on Saint Johns River, but it is "now all demolished, and[...]laid waste"

Widow may sue late husband's heir for her "reasonable dower" of one-third of "houses, lands, tenement or hereditaments," or of rents or profits

Trader Benjamin Lester on Trinity, Newfoundland damage when tide pushed by easterly gale tosses ships around "at near an hours time every where"

Travelling to St. Pierre on scientific expedition in July 1768, Cassini describes constant frustration (and danger) of being fogbound on Grand Banks

Orders to settle St. John's Island with civil government, grants of townships to noblemen, and 3 towns: Charlotte-Town, George-Town and Prince-Town

Description of Hudson Strait Inuit clothing (men's and women's, including tall boots in which babies can be carried), plus praise for Inuit "disposition"

References 

 
Canada
68